Rico Sharod Dowdle Jr. (born June 14, 1998) is an American football running back for the Dallas Cowboys of the National Football League (NFL). He played college football at South Carolina.

Early years 
Dowdle attended A.C. Reynolds High School. As a senior, he was switched from running back to quarterback, leading the team to an 11-2 overall record and 6-0 in the conference. He had 247 carries for 2,545 yards and 51 rushing touchdowns. He also passed for 1,434 yards, 11 touchdowns, 4 interceptions and had a 55-yard touchdown reception. His 63 total touchdowns was a WNC single-season record. He received All-WNC Player of the Year, Parade All-American and All-state honors.

He was a three star recruit coming out of high school and committed to play football at the University of South Carolina, turning down offers from Boston College and North Carolina State.

College career 
As a freshman, he had offseason surgery to recover from a sports hernia and was forced to miss the first 4 contests. He appeared in 9 games with 7 starts. He led the team with 133 carries for 764 yards (5.7-yard avg.) and 6 rushing touchdowns. He also had 15 receptions for 55 yards and one receiving touchdown. He had 27 carries for 149 yards, one rushing touchdown, 3 receptions for 20 yards and one receiving touchdown against the University of Missouri. He made 21 carries for 226 yards (sixth in school history) and 2 rushing touchdowns against Western Carolina University.

As a sophomore, he was named the starter at running back and appeared in 8 games with 4 starts. He registered 66 carries for 251 yards, 2 rushing touchdowns, 11 receptions for 128 yards and one receiving touchdown. He broke his leg in the seventh game against the University of Tennessee and was forced to miss the final five contests of the regular season. He returned to play in the 2018 Outback Bowl, collecting 6 carries for 45 yards, one rushing touchdown and 3 receptions for 32 yards.

As a junior, he appeared in 12 games, leading the team with 123 carries for 654 yards and 4 rushing touchdowns. He also had 14 receptions for 133 yards and one receiving touchdown. He suffered a left ankle injury in the first carry against the University of Mississippi and did not return. He was limited in the next 2 contests. He had 20 carries for 112 yards and one touchdown against Vanderbilt University. He made 14 carries for 140 yards and one touchdown against the University of Tennessee.

As a senior, he was limited in the offseason with a groin injury. He was part of a platoon at the running back position with Tavien Feaster. He rushed at nearly six yards per attempt during the first 6 contests of the season, until suffering a right knee injury against the University of Florida, which forced him to miss the next 2 contests. He was second on the team with 108 carries for 498 yards and 4 rushing touchdowns.

Dowdle finished 15th on the school's All-time rushing list, totaling 2,167 rushing yards and 16 touchdowns in 39 games. He compiled eight 100-yard rushing games, including a career-best 226-yard contest. Dowdle played in the 2020 East-West Shrine Bowl, rushing for fifty yards.

Professional career 

Dowdle was signed as an undrafted free agent by the Dallas Cowboys after the 2020 NFL Draft on April 27. He was one of ten rookies to make the Cowboys final roster, as the third string running back behind Ezekiel Elliott and Tony Pollard.

On August 25, 2021, Dowdle was placed on injured reserve with a hip injury.

On October 15, 2022, Dowdle was placed on injured reserve.

References

External links
South Carolina Gamecocks bio
Dallas Cowboys bio

Living people
1998 births
American football running backs
Players of American football from North Carolina
South Carolina Gamecocks football players
Sportspeople from Asheville, North Carolina
Dallas Cowboys players